Tipula hermannia is a species in the family Tipulidae ("large crane flies"), in the order Diptera ("flies").

References

Further reading

External links
Diptera.info
NCBI Taxonomy Browser, Tipula hermannia

Tipulidae